KYKZ (96.1 FM) is a country formatted broadcast radio station licensed to Lake Charles, Louisiana, serving Southwestern Louisiana. KYKZ is owned and operated by Cumulus Media. Its studios are at 425 Broad Street in downtown Lake Charles and its transmitter is in Sulphur, Louisiana.

References

External links
Kicks 96 Online

1976 establishments in Louisiana
Country radio stations in the United States
Radio stations established in 1976
YKZ
Cumulus Media radio stations